Roland Romario Alberg (born 6 August 1990) is a professional footballer who plays as a midfielder for MVV. Born in the Netherlands, he represents the Suriname national team.

Club career

Netherland and Turkey
After coming through the AZ Alkmaar youth system, Alberg made his professional debut with Eredivisie side Excelsior in the 2011/12 season and moved to Turkish outfit Elazığspor in January 2013 after falling out with the Rotterdam club who claimed he had spit at his own supporters. ADO Den Haag however claimed Alberg had also signed a contract with them.

He finally joined Den Haag in September 2013. Between 2013 and 2016, he appeared in 71 league matches for ADO, scoring sixteen goals.

Philadelphia Union

Alberg was acquired by the Philadelphia Union in February 2016. On 1 November 2017, after two years with the club, his 2018 option was declined by the Union.

CSKA Sofia
It was announced on 31 October 2017 that Alberg signed a two-year contract with CSKA Sofia. He officially joined the club on 1 January 2018 at the conclusion of his MLS contract, but was released at the end of the 2017–18 season.

Panionios
On 13 June 2018, he joined Greek Superleague club Panionios. He has appeared in three league matches, scoring one goal.

Roda JC Kerkrade
Alberg plied his trade with Roda JC in the second tier of the Dutch League system Eerste Divisie in 2019. He appeared in 39 league matches for the side and scored seventeen goals before his loan transfer to Hyderabad.

Hyderabad FC 
On 28 December 2020, it was announced that Alberg would join Indian Super League side Hyderabad on loan from Dutch team Roda JC Kerkrade as their 7th foreign recruit when the winter transfer window opened on 1 January 2021.

He made his debut for Hyderabad on 16 January 2021 against Mumbai City, coming on as a substitute in the 74th minute.

On 22 February, he scored his first ever goal for Hyderabad against ATK Mohun Bagan in a 2–2 draw match.

International career
Born in the Netherlands, Alberg currently holds the Surinamese citizenship. He has represented Nederlands U18 from 2007 to 2008. He has also represented U20 between 2011 and 2012.

He played an unofficial friendly match for the Suriname national team against Curaçao in May 2015.

In October 2020, he has been called up to the national squad of Suriname by coach Dean Gorré after receiving the green light from FIFA to call-up eight Dutch origin players including several that currently play in the Netherlands. In February 2021, he has been called up to the Suriname national team for the upcoming 2022 FIFA World Cup Qualifiers in the CONCACAF (North and Central America) region, where Suriname were slated to play against Cayman Islands (24 March) and Aruba (27 March) in the first round of the qualifiers.

Alberg made his official international debut for Suriname against Cayman Islands in a 2022 FIFA World Cup qualification match on 24 March 2021. He scored his first goal against Aruba on 27 March in a 6–0 win. In June 2021 Alberg was named to the Suriname squad for the 2021 CONCACAF Gold Cup.

Personal life
He is a younger brother of former player Ibad Muhamadu and an uncle of Lorenzo Ebecilio.

Honours

Club
CSKA Sofia
Bulgarian First League runner-up: 2017–18

See also
 Surinamese footballers

References

External links
 
 

1990 births
Living people
People from Hoorn
Surinamese footballers
Suriname international footballers
Dutch footballers
Netherlands youth international footballers
Dutch sportspeople of Surinamese descent
Association football midfielders
Excelsior Rotterdam players
Elazığspor footballers
ADO Den Haag players
Philadelphia Union players
PFC CSKA Sofia players
Panionios F.C. players
Roda JC Kerkrade players
Hyderabad FC players
MVV Maastricht players
Eredivisie players
Eerste Divisie players
Süper Lig players
Major League Soccer players
First Professional Football League (Bulgaria) players
Super League Greece players
Indian Super League players
Surinamese expatriate footballers
2021 CONCACAF Gold Cup players
Dutch expatriate footballers
Expatriate footballers in Turkey
Surinamese expatriate sportspeople in Turkey
Dutch expatriate sportspeople in Turkey
Expatriate soccer players in the United States
Surinamese expatriate sportspeople in the United States
Dutch expatriate sportspeople in the United States
Expatriate footballers in Bulgaria
Surinamese expatriate sportspeople in Bulgaria
Dutch expatriate sportspeople in Bulgaria
Expatriate footballers in Greece
Surinamese expatriate sportspeople in Greece
Expatriate footballers in India
Surinamese expatriate sportspeople in India
Dutch expatriate sportspeople in Greece
HVV Hollandia players
Footballers from North Holland